Chan Man-kwai (born 1 April 1948) is a Chinese screenwriter who began his career in Hong Kong. He has written over 40 films and TV series in Hong Kong, Taiwan and mainland China.

Chan was born and grew up in Xiamen. During the Cultural Revolution he laboured as a sent-down youth in the mountains of Yongding in southwestern Fujian. After the Cultural Revolution, he migrated to British Hong Kong in 1978, doing odd-and-end jobs for 3 years before deciding to write fiction. One of his works was published in the magazine Southern Movies, run by the renowned Shaw Brothers Studio, which hired him as a screenwriter shortly thereafter.

Filmography (incomplete)

Films

TV series

References

External links

 

1948 births
People from Xiamen
Living people
Screenwriters from Fujian
Sent-down youths